The Greensboro Monarchs were a professional ice hockey team based in Greensboro, North Carolina. The Monarchs joined the East Coast Hockey League (ECHL) as an expansion franchise prior to the start of the 1989–90 season and surrendered the franchise back to the league when the Monarchs ownership obtained an expansion franchise in the American Hockey League (AHL) at the conclusion of the 1994–95 ECHL season.

History
The Monarchs played in the ECHL from 1989 until 1995, reaching the playoffs in every season. They won the Riley Cup league championship in their inaugural season, beating the Winston-Salem Thunderbirds four games to one. Goalie Wade Flaherty was named playoff MVP.  The Monarchs also reached the Riley Cup Finals in 1991 and 1995.

With some of the owners voting to enter the higher level American Hockey League, the franchise was canceled by the ECHL.  The ownership renamed the new franchise the Carolina Monarchs and played in the AHL for the 1995–96 season before their lease was revoked by the Greensboro Coliseum when the Hartford Whalers of the National Hockey League (NHL) moved temporarily to Greensboro and became the Carolina Hurricanes. The Hurricanes then moved into their new arena and permanent home in Raleigh, North Carolina.

Season-by-season results
Note: GP = Games played, W = Wins, L = Losses, OTL = Overtime losses, SOL = Shootout losses, Pts = Points, GF = Goals for, GA = Goals against, PIM = Penalties in minutes.

Defunct ECHL teams
Ice hockey teams in North Carolina
Sports in Greensboro, North Carolina
Defunct ice hockey teams in the United States
Ice hockey clubs established in 1989
Sports clubs disestablished in 1995
Anaheim Ducks minor league affiliates